Eurylochus may refer to:
Mythological characters
 Eurylochus (mythology), second-in-command of Odysseus' ship in Homer's Odyssey
 Eurylochus, one of the sons of Aegyptus and Caliadne. He married (and was murdered by) Autonoe, daughter of Danaus and Polyxo
 Eurylochus from Zacynthos, one of the suitors of Penelope. He spoke out against Odysseus in the Odyssey
 Eurylochus, dragon-slayer of the mythological dragon Cychreides on the isle of Salamis
Historical characters
 Eurylochus (Thessalian general) (6th century BC), Thessalian general from the Aleuadae family who fought in the First Sacred War
 Eurylochus (Spartan general) (died 426 BC), Spartan general during the Peloponnesian War, was killed at the Battle of Olpae
 Eurylochus (4th century BC), a student of Pyrrho along with Hecataeus of Abdera and others (the 'Pyrrhoneans')